Wailapa, or Ale, is an Oceanic language spoken on Espiritu Santo Island in Vanuatu. It is in a dialect chain between Akei and Penantsiro, but these are not mutually intelligible.

References

Espiritu Santo languages
Languages of Vanuatu